In enzymology, a sterol 24-C-methyltransferase is an enzyme that catalyzes the chemical reaction

S-adenosyl-L-methionine + 5alpha-cholesta-8,24-dien-3beta-ol  S-adenosyl-L-homocysteine + 24-methylene-5alpha-cholest-8-en-3beta-ol

Thus, the two substrates of this enzyme are S-adenosyl methionine and 5alpha-cholesta-8,24-dien-3beta-ol, whereas its two products are S-adenosylhomocysteine and 24-methylene-5alpha-cholest-8-en-3beta-ol.

This enzyme belongs to the family of transferases, specifically those transferring one-carbon group methyltransferases.  The systematic name of this enzyme class is S-adenosyl-L-methionine:zymosterol 24-C-methyltransferase. Other names in common use include Delta24-methyltransferase, Delta24-sterol methyltransferase, zymosterol-24-methyltransferase, S-adenosyl-4-methionine:sterol Delta24-methyltransferase, SMT1, 24-sterol C-methyltransferase, S-adenosyl-L-methionine:Delta24(23)-sterol methyltransferase, and phytosterol methyltransferase.  This enzyme participates in biosynthesis of steroids.  It employs one cofactor, glutathione.

References

 
 
 
 
 

EC 2.1.1
Enzymes of unknown structure